Rhabdatomis cora is a moth in the subfamily Arctiinae. It was described by Harrison Gray Dyar Jr. in 1907. It is found in French Guiana, Panama and Costa Rica.

Subspecies
Rhabdatomis cora cora (French Guiana)
Rhabdatomis cora coroides (Schaus, 1911) (Costa Rica)

References

Arctiidae genus list at Butterflies and Moths of the World of the Natural History Museum

Moths described in 1907
Cisthenina
Arctiinae of South America